Opomyzidae is a family of acalyptrate Diptera. They are generally small, slender, yellow, brown or black coloured flies. The larval food plants are grasses, including cereal crops, the adults are mainly found in open habitats. Some species being agricultural pests.

Description
For terms see Morphology of Diptera.
Small slender yellow, brown, reddish or black flies. The narrow wings are usually with light or dark-colored spots (darkly marked crossveins apical spot). Head with one pair of backwardly directed orbital (frontal bristles)  bristles. Scattered interfrontal setulae are present Ocellar bristles are present. Postvertical bristles are absent (rarely present). Vibrissae absent but Geomyza with a strong bristle near the vibrissal angle. Ocelli are present and the arista is pubescent or with long hairs. Tibae without preapical dorsal bristles. R1 is short, the subcosta ends near the break of the costa (usually incomplete but apical part sometimes visible as a faint line reaching the costa) and near apex of R1;posterior basal wing cell and anal cell are small. 
The crossvein BM-Cu is present but usually incomplete. Tibiae without dorsal preapical bristle.

Species
Genus Anomalochaeta Frey, 1910
Anomalochaeta guttipennis (Zetterstedt, 1838)
Genus Geomyza Fallén, 1810

Geomyza angustipennis Zetterstedt, 1847
Geomyza apicalis (Meigen, 1830)
Geomyza balachowskyi Mesnil, 1934
Geomyza breviseta Czerny, 1928
Geomyza hackmani Nartshuk, 1984
Geomyza hendeli Czerny, 1928
Geomyza majuscula (Loew, 1864)
Geomyza nartshukae Carles-Tolrá, 1993
Geomyza subnigra Drake, 1992
Geomyza tripunctata Fallén, 1823
Geomyza venusta (Meigen, 1830)
Genus Opomyza Fallén, 1820

Opomyza athamus (Séguy, 1928)
Opomyza florum (Fabricius, 1794)
Opomyza germinationis (Linnaeus, 1758 )
Opomyza limbatus (Williston, 1886)
Opomyza lineatopunctata von Roser, 1840
Opomyza petrei Mesnil, 1934
Opomyza punctata Haliday, 1833
Opomyza punctella Fallén, 1820
Opomyza townsendi (Williston, 1898)
Genus Scelomyza Séguy, 1938
Scelomyza hirticornis Séguy, 1938

Biology
The larvae live in the stems of grasses, a few species being a pest in agriculture, for instance Opomyza florum, the Yellow Cereal fly. Damage caused by Opomyzidae to Gramineae is termed "dead heart".

Identification
E. Brunel, 1998 Family Opomyzidae. In: Papp, L. og Darvas, B. (red.): Contributions to a Manual of Palaearctic Diptera. 3: 259-266. Science Herald, Budapest
Drake, C.M. 1993. A review of the British Opomyzidae. British Journal of Entomology and Natural History 6: 159-176.
Hackman, W., 1958 The Opomyzidae (Dipt.) of Eastern Fennoscandia. Notulae Entomologicae 38 : 114-126.
Czerny. 1930.Opomyzidae. In: Lindner, E. (Ed.). Die Fliegen der Paläarktischen Region 6, 1,54c, 1-15. Keys to Palaearctic species but now needs revision (in German).
Séguy, E., 1934 Diptères: Brachycères. T.II. Muscidae acalypterae, Scatophagidae. Paris: Éditions Faune de France 28.BibliothequeVirtuelleNumerique pdf
Stackelberg,A.A., 1988 Family Opomyzidae in  Bei-Bienko, G. Ya, 1988 Keys to the insects of the European Part of the USSR Volume 5 (Diptera) Part 2 English edition. Keys to Palaearctic species but now needs revision.

Phylogeny

Gallery

References

External links

Opomyzidae in Italian
Family description
Gallery of Opomyzidae
Family Opomyzidae at EOL images
Geomyza illustrations
Encyclopedia of Life World taxa list
Jindřich Roháček

 
Agricultural pest insects
Brachycera families
Articles containing video clips